Belarus participated in the Junior Eurovision Song Contest 2017 which took place in Tbilisi, Georgia on 26 November 2017. The Belarusian entry for the 2017 contest in Tbilisi, Georgia was selected through a national final organised by the Belarusian broadcaster National State Television and Radio Company of the Republic of Belarus (BTRC). A national final, which took place on 25 August 2017, saw ten competing acts participating in a televised production where the winner was determined by a 50/50 combination of votes from a jury made up of music professionals and a public telephone vote. Helena Meraai won the national final by receiving the most votes from both the professional jury and televoters and she represented Belarus in Georgia with the song "I Am The One".

Background

The country hosted the  contest in Minsk. In 2016, Alexander Minyonok represented Belarus in Valletta, Malta with the song "Musyka moikh pobed (Music is My Only Way)". It ended in 7th place with 177 points.

Before Junior Eurovision

National final
The national final took place on 25 August 2017. It consisted of ten competing acts participating in a televised production where the winner was determined by a 50/50 combination of both telephone vote and the votes of a jury made up of music professionals. The show was opened by the last year's representative Alexander Minyonok, who performed his entry “Musyka moikh pobed (Music Is My Only Way)”. He also sang a cover version of Shawn Mendes' song "There's Nothing Holdin' Me Back". Moreover, some of the singers that did not manage to reach the national final, but showed potential at the live auditions, were also guests of the show. At the end of the show, it was revealed that Helena Meraai won the national final by receiving the most votes from both the professional jury and televoters. The public televote in the final registered 38,729 votes. Respectively, Helena won the televote with 53,7%.

Artist and song information

Helena Meraai

Helena Meraai (born 2 May 2003) is a Belarusian singer. She represented Belarus in the Junior Eurovision Song Contest 2017 with the song "I am the One". She took part in the Russian version of The Voice Kids, where she was defeated in the battle round. Shortly after, she represented Russia in the 2016 edition of the children's festival New Wave Junior as part of a trio, where she won along with two other girls. Her mother is Belarusian, while her father is from Syria.

On 26 October 2018, it was announced that Maraai would host the Junior Eurovision Song Contest 2018, alongside TV presenter Eugene Perlin and singer Zinaida Kupriyanovich, in Minsk. The following day it was confirmed that Meraai would host the green room. Earlier in the year she was one of the green room hosts alongside Ruslan Aslanov at the Belarusian national final. She took part in the 9th season Ukrainian version of X Factor, where she was eliminated in the "Bootcamp" round. In 2020 she hosted the Belarusian national final for the Eurovision Song Contest with Eugene Perlin.

"I Am the One"

"I Am the One" is a song by Belarusian singer Helena Meraai. It represented Belarus in the Junior Eurovision Song Contest 2017.

At Junior Eurovision
During the opening ceremony and the running order draw which both took place on 20 November 2017, Belarus was drawn to perform in position 5 on 26 November 2017, following Armenia and preceding Portugal.

Voting

Detailed voting results

References

Junior Eurovision Song Contest
Belarus
2017